Calliotropis pulvinaris is a species of sea snail, a marine gastropod mollusk in the family Eucyclidae.

Description

The shell can grow to be 20 mm to 30 mm in length.

Distribution
Can be found off the coast of west Madagascar.

References

 Vilvens C. (2007) New records and new species of Calliotropis from Indo-Pacific. Novapex 8 (Hors Série 5): 1–72.

External links

pulvinaris
Gastropods described in 2005